In mathematics, the ring of polynomial functions on a vector space V over a field k gives a coordinate-free analog of a polynomial ring. It is denoted by k[V]. If V is finite dimensional and is viewed as an algebraic variety, then k[V] is precisely the coordinate ring of V.

The explicit definition of the ring can be given as follows.

If k is infinite, then k[V] is the symmetric algebra of the dual space .

In applications, one also defines k[V] when V is defined over some subfield of k (e.g., k is the complex field and V is a real vector space.) The same definition still applies.

Throughout the article, for simplicity, the base field k is assumed to be infinite.

Relation with polynomial ring 
Let  be the set of all polynomials over a field K and B be the set of all polynomial functions in one variable over K.  Both A and B are algebras over K given by the standard multiplication and addition of polynomials and functions. A routine check shows that the mapping  is a homomorphism of the algebras A and B. This homomorphism is an isomorphism if and only if K is an infinite field. For example, if K is a finite field then let . p is a nonzero polynomial in K[x], however  for all t in K, so  is the zero function and our homomorphism is not an isomorphism (and, actually, the algebras are not isomorphic, since the algebra of polynomials is infinite while that of polynomial functions is finite).

If K is infinite then choose a polynomial f such that . We want to show this implies that . Hence the mapping  is injective. Since this mapping is clearly surjective, it is bijective and thus an algebra isomorphism of A and B.

Symmetric multilinear maps 
Let k be an infinite field of characteristic zero (or at least very large) and V a finite-dimensional vector space.

Let  denote the vector space of multilinear functionals  that are symmetric;  is the same for all permutations of 's.

Any λ in  gives rise to a homogeneous polynomial function f of degree q: we just let  To see that f is a polynomial function, choose a basis  of V and  its dual. Then
,
which implies f is a polynomial in the ti's.

Thus, there is a well-defined linear map:

We show it is an isomorphism. Choosing a basis as before, any homogeneous polynomial function f of degree q can be written as:

Let

Clearly,  is the identity; in particular, φ is surjective. To see φ is injective, suppose φ(λ) = 0. Consider
,
which is zero. The coefficient of t1t2 … tq in the above expression is q! times λ(v1, …, vq); it follows that λ = 0.

Note: φ is independent of a choice of basis; so the above proof shows that ψ is also independent of a basis, the fact not a priori obvious.

Example: A bilinear functional gives rise to a quadratic form in a unique way and any quadratic form arises in this way.

Taylor series expansion 

Given a smooth function, locally, one can get a partial derivative of the function from its Taylor series expansion and, conversely, one can recover the function from the series expansion. This fact continues to hold for polynomials functions on a vector space. If f is in k[V], then we write: for x, y in V,

where gn(x, y) are homogeneous of degree n in y, and only finitely many of them are nonzero. We then let

resulting in the linear endomorphism Py of k[V]. It is called the polarization operator. We then have, as promised:

Proof: We first note that (Py f) (x) is the coefficient of t in f(x + t y); in other words, since g0(x, y) = g0(x, 0) = f(x),

where the right-hand side is, by definition,

The theorem follows from this. For example, for n = 2, we have:

The general case is similar.

Operator product algebra
When the polynomials are valued not over a field k, but over some algebra, then one may define additional structure.  Thus, for example, one may consider the ring of functions over GL(n,m), instead of for k = GL(1,m). In this case, one may impose an additional axiom.

The operator product algebra is an associative algebra of the form

The structure constants  are required to be single-valued functions, rather than sections of some vector bundle. The fields (or operators)  are required to span the ring of functions. Thus, the ring of functions can be taken to be the ring of polynomial functions.

The above can be considered to be an additional requirement imposed on the ring; it is sometimes called the bootstrap.  In physics, a special case of the operator product algebra is known as the operator product expansion.

See also 
 Algebraic geometry of projective spaces
 Polynomial ring
 Symmetric algebra
 Zariski tangent space

Notes

References 
 .

Polynomial functions
Ring theory